The Toledo City Science High School (Mataas na Paaralang Pang-Agham ng Toledo), also known as TCSHS, is a public science high school in Ilihan Heights, Toledo, Cebu, Philippines. It is a DepEd-recognized science high school. It was founded in 1996 in response to the department's call to focus in math and science education. It started with 25 first-year students and was annexed to Bato National High School which was the lead school in the Division of Toledo City.

The school is in Barangay Ilihan which got its name from the word "Alihan" whose meaning is to barricade. During World War II, Filipino guerrillas had foxholes in this barangay to prevent the Japanese from attacking Toledo City. There were also barricades made of stones which were used as shields. The area is an ideal place to hide the natives from the Japanese invaders.

Science high schools in the Philippines
High schools in Cebu
Educational institutions established in 1996
1996 establishments in the Philippines